The 2015 IIHF Inline Hockey World Championship Division I was an international inline hockey tournament run by the International Ice Hockey Federation. The Division I tournament ran alongside the 2015 IIHF Inline Hockey World Championship and took place between 5 and 11 July 2015 in Tampere, Finland. The tournament was won by Croatia who upon winning gained promotion to the 2017 IIHF Inline Hockey World Championship. While Austria and Bulgaria were relegated to the European Qualification after losing their placement round games along with Latvia who lost the relegation game against Hungary.

Qualification
Seven teams attempted to qualify for the two remaining spots in the 2015 IIHF Inline Hockey World Championship Division I tournament. The other six nations automatically qualified after their results from the 2014 Championship and the 2014 Division I tournaments. Two qualification tournaments were held with a place awarded to the winner of each tournament. The European Qualification tournament was contested between Bulgaria, Israel, Macedonia and Serbia, with Bulgaria winning promotion and returning to Division I after being relegated in 2013. The Rest of the World Qualification tournament was contested between Argentina, Chile and Hong Kong, with Argentina winning promotion after also being relegated in 2013.

 − Winner of the Rest of the World Qualification
 − Finished second in 2014 World Championship Division I
 − Finished fifth in 2014 World Championship Division I
 − Winner of the European Qualification
 − Finished third in 2014 World Championship Division I
 − Relegated from the 2014 World Championship
 − Finished sixth in 2014 World Championship Division I
 − Finished fourth in 2014 World Championship Division I

European Qualification
The European Qualification tournament was held at the Winter Sports Palace in Sofia, Bulgaria from 4 July to 6 July 2014. Bulgaria gained promotion to Division I after winning their three games and finishing first in the standings. Israel finished in second place and Serbia in third.

All times are local.

Rest of the World Qualification
The Rest of the World Qualification tournament was held at the Peru Beach Hockey Arena in Buenos Aires, Argentina from 19 November to 21 November 2014. Argentina gained promotion to Division I after winning both of their games and finishing first in the standings. Hong Kong finished in second place after winning their game against Chile.

All times are local.

Seeding and groups
The seeding in the preliminary round was based on the final standings at the 2014 IIHF Inline Hockey World Championship and 2014 IIHF Inline Hockey World Championship Division I. Division I's groups are named Group C and Group D while the 2015 IIHF Inline Hockey World Championship use Group A and Group B, as both tournaments are held in Tampere, Finland. The teams were grouped accordingly by seeding at the previous year's tournament (in parenthesis is the corresponding seeding):

Group C
 (9)
 (12)
 (13)
 (16)

Group D
 (10)
 (11)
 (14)
 (15)

Preliminary round
Eight participating teams were placed in the following two groups. After playing a round-robin, every team advanced to the Playoff round.

All times are local (UTC+3).

Group C

Group D

Playoff round
All eight teams advanced into the playoff round and were seeded into the quarterfinals according to their result in the preliminary round. The winning quarter finalists advanced through to the semifinals, while the losing teams moved through to the placement round. Austria and Bulgaria were relegated to the European Qualification after losing their placement round games and finished the tournament in seventh and eighth respectively. After winning their placement round games Latvia and Hungary competed in the relegation game with Latvia being relegated to the European Qualification after losing 3–4. The number of teams relegated to the Qualification tournaments was increased from two to three due to a change in format by the IIHF. The change means that three qualification tournaments will be held in the even years, starting in 2016, and the World Championships will be held in the odd years, starting in 2017. The qualification tournaments have been restructured into three regions to lower travel costs with the regions now being Africa / South America, Asia / Oceania, and Europe / North America. In the semifinals Australia defeated Great Britain and Croatia beat Argentina, both advancing to the gold medal game. After losing the semifinals Great Britain and Argentina played off for the bronze medal with Great Britain winning 3–2. Croatia defeated Australia 5–4 in overtime in the gold medal game and earned promotion to the 2017 IIHF Inline Hockey World Championship.

All times are local (UTC+3).

Quarterfinals

Placement round

Semifinals

Relegation game

Bronze medal game

Gold medal game

Ranking and statistics

Final standings
The final standings of the tournament according to IIHF:

Tournament Awards
Best players selected by the directorate:
Best Goalkeeper:  Mate Tomljenovic
Best Defenseman:  Cameron Todd
Best Forward:  Ivan Jankovic

Scoring leaders
List shows the top skaters sorted by points, then goals. If the list exceeds 10 skaters because of a tie in points, all of the tied skaters are shown.

Leading goaltenders
Only the top five goaltenders, based on save percentage, who have played at least 40% of their team's minutes are included in this list.

References

External links
Division I at IIHF.com

IIHF Inline Hockey World Championship Division I
2015 in inline hockey
IIHF InLine Hockey World Championship
IIHF Inline Hockey World Championship Division I
Sports competitions in Tampere
July 2015 sports events in Europe
Inline hockey in Finland